John Pisani is a retired American soccer midfielder who played professionally in the North American Soccer League.

Pisani graduated from Christian Brothers College High School.  Between 1963 and 1966, he scored 138 goals in 122 games.  He then attended St. Louis University where he played on the men's soccer team from 1967 to 1969.  He was a member of the 1967 and 1969 NCAA championship teams and is a member of the Billikens Soccer Hall of Fame.  In 1999, he was inducted into the St. Louis Soccer Hall of Fame.  In 1970, he signed with the St. Louis Stars of the North American Soccer League.  He played for them until 1972 and again from 1974 to 1975.

References

External links
NASL stats

1947 births
Living people
American soccer players
North American Soccer League (1968–1984) players
St. Louis Stars (soccer) players
Saint Louis University alumni
Saint Louis Billikens men's soccer players
Association football midfielders
Soccer players from St. Louis